Sandy Parker (born March 2, 1952) is a Canadian retired professional wrestler. She debuted in 1969, wrestling in Canada, the United States, and Japan. In Japan, she worked for All Japan Women's Pro-Wrestling, holding numerous titles. She also had an unofficial NWA Women's World Tag Team Championship reign with partner Sue Green.

Professional wrestling career 
After attending a professional wrestling match, Parker became addicted to the sport. At first, she went to the matches several times every week. She then decided to try the profession at the suggestion of a friend. Although she lived in Ontario, she traveled to Michigan three times a week to train with Lou Klein, Mary Jane Mull, and Lucille Dupree. She officially debuted in the early 1970s at the age of 23. She later went to The Fabulous Moolah's training school in South Carolina for further training, but left when she began having problems with Moolah. After leaving the school, Parker worked for Mildred Burke.

Parker worked under her real name instead of a ring name, because she was once unable to cash a check when it was written for her under the wrestling name; she could not provide identification for it, so she vowed never to use a ring name again.

In the early 1970s, Parker formed a partnership with Sue Green, with whom she defeated Donna Christanello and Toni Rose in November 1971 for the NWA Women's World Tag Team Championship. They lost the title to Christanello and Rose in February 1972. The title change is unrecognized. In August of that year, Parker competed at the Superbowl of Wrestling, where she teamed with Debbie Johnson to take on Rose and Christanello, but they failed to defeat them for the championship.

She began a tour of Japan also in the early 1970s. In 1973, she held All Japan Women's Pro-Wrestling's WWWA World Single Championship for approximately two months. Between June of that year and July 1974, she also held the promotion's WWWA World Tag Team Championship eight times, twice with Masked Lee, twice with Jean Antoine, and four times with Betty Niccoli. It is possible, however, that only six of the tag title reigns are officially recognized.

Back in the United States in 1975, Parker wrestled against Antoine in the first women's wrestling match in the state of Oregon in 50 years. Parker retired in 1986. In 2004, she was honored by the Cauliflower Alley Club, a society of retired professional wrestlers.

Personal life 
Parker was raised by her grandmother, as her mom was unable to take care of her. As a child, she considered herself a "tomboy", participating in fights, baseball, and tree climbing. Parker is a lesbian. She, however, was once married to a man. After leaving the business, Parker worked as a bartender, store manager, and security guard.

Championships and accomplishments
 All Japan Women's Pro-Wrestling
 WWWA World Single Championship (1 time)
 WWWA World Tag Team Championship (8 times) - with Betty Niccoli (4), Jean Antoine (2) and Masked Lee (2)
 Cauliflower Alley Club
 Ladies Wrestling (2004)
 National Wrestling Alliance
 NWA United States Women's Championship (1 time)
 NWA World Women's Tag Team Championship (1 time) - with Susan Green
 Other titles
 California Women's Championship (1 time)

References

External links 
 

1952 births
Living people
Black Canadian sportspeople
Black Canadian sportswomen
Canadian female professional wrestlers
Lesbian sportswomen
Canadian LGBT sportspeople
LGBT professional wrestlers
Professional wrestlers from Vancouver
Black Canadian LGBT people
20th-century professional wrestlers